The 2023 Wyoming Cowboys football team represent the University of Wyoming as a member of the Mountain Division of the Mountain West Conference during the 2023 NCAA Division I FBS football season. The Cowboys will be led by tenth-year head coach Craig Bohl and play their home games at War Memorial Stadium.

Schedule

References

Wyoming
Wyoming Cowboys football seasons
Wyoming Cowboys football